Into Your Head is the second studio album by the English music group BBMak, released on 27 August 2002 by Hollywood Records. It peaked at #25 in the US, spawning the hit single "Out of My Heart". The album is an enhanced CD, containing regular audio tracks and multimedia computer files.

The Japanese edition of the 2002 album includes two exclusive bonus tracks, "So Wrong So Right" and "Never Gonna Give You Up", as well as the enhanced videos to "Back Here" and "Still On Your Side".

Track listing
All songs written by BBMak. Additional writers are listed, where applicable.

Charts

Weekly charts

Notes

External links 
Review by Entertainment Weekly

BBMak albums
2002 albums
Hollywood Records albums
Albums produced by Rob Cavallo
Albums produced by Stephen Lironi